Ellacoya State Park is a public recreation area located on the southwest shore of Lake Winnipesaukee in Gilford, New Hampshire. The state park has  of beachfront, swimming, boating, picnicking, and campground.

References

External links
Ellacoya State Park New Hampshire Department of Natural and Cultural Resources

State parks of New Hampshire
Parks in Belknap County, New Hampshire
Lake Winnipesaukee
Gilford, New Hampshire
Protected areas established in 1956
1956 establishments in New Hampshire